The Ilimbav gas field is a natural gas field located in Marpod, Sibiu County. It was discovered in 1932 and developed by and Romgaz. It began production in 1935 and produces natural gas and condensates. The total proven reserves of the Ilimbav gas field are around 532 billion cubic feet (15 km³), and production is slated to be around 12 million cubic feet/day (0.33×105m³) in 2010.

References

Natural gas fields in Romania